Lakeview School may refer to:

Lakeview School (Birmingham, Alabama), listed on the National Register of Historic Places in Birmingham, Alabama
Lakeview School (Mercer Island, Washington), listed on the National Register of Historic Places in King County, Washington